Malaysia competed for the first time in the 1966 British Empire and Commonwealth Games held in Kingston, Jamaica from 4 to 13 August 1966.

Medal summary

Medals by sport

Medallists

Athletics

Men
Track events

Field events

Women
Track events

Key
Note–Ranks given for track events are within the athlete's heat only
Q = Qualified for the next round
q = Qualified for the next round as a fastest loser or, in field events, by position without achieving the qualifying target
NR = National record
N/A = Round not applicable for the event
Bye = Athlete not required to compete in round

Badminton

Shooting

Men

Swimming

Men

Weightlifting

Men

References

Malaysia at the Commonwealth Games
Nations at the 1966 British Empire and Commonwealth Games
1966 in Malaysian sport